San Felipe International Airport is an international airport located  south of the central business district (CBD) of San Felipe, Baja California, Mexico, a town located on the Gulf of California coast.

The airport has no commercial air service.  Commercial flights were available several times over the years, most recently with SeaPort Airlines to San Diego from December 2014 to January 2016.

The airport serves as a port of entry into Mexico for general aviation. The airport is operated by Patronato para la Administración del Aeropuerto de San Felipe, a company owned by the Baja California State Government.

References

External links
 San Felipe International Airport Info
 Info about SFH Airport
 San Felipe Flights

Airports in Baja California
Mexicali